Rachel Lee may refer to:
 Sue Civil-Brown, author writing under the pseudonym "Rachel Lee"
 Rachel Lee (actress) (born 1966), also credited as Loletta Lee
 Rachel Fanny Antonina Lee, British alleged kidnap victim
 Rachel Lee (criminal), thief known for being a member of the Bling Ring group
 Rachel Lee Priday (born 1988), violinist

See also